Cathy Wilcox (born 1963) is an Australian cartoonist and children's book illustrator, best known for her work as a cartoonist for The Sydney Morning Herald and The Age newspapers.  She has also twice won the Australian Children's Book Council's 'Picture Book of the Year' award. In 2007 she won the Walkley Award in Cartooning for a cartoon about Sheikh Taj el-Din al Hilaly's infamous 'uncovered meat' remarks on Australian women. She went on to win a second Walkley Award in Cartoon for 'Kevin Cleans Up' and a third in 2017 for 'Low-cost Housing, London' which is a reference to the Grenfell Tower fire in North Kensington, London.

Wilcox won her first Australian Cartoonist Association Stanley Award for Best Editorial/Political Cartoonist and Best Single Gag Artist for her work in The Sydney Morning Herald in 1994. Since then, she has received a Stanley Award for Single Gag Cartoonist in 1997, 2014 and 2015 and was a finalist in 2018.

Wilcox was named Cartoonist of the Year in 2009, 2016 and 2020 by the Museum of Australian Democracy.

References

 Interview with Cathy Wilcox, cartoonist and illustrator (1998 sound recording) – interviewed by Ann Turner
 The bad guys are winning cartoons / Cathy Wilcox with foreword by James Valentine (2005)
  Enzo the Wonderfish / written and illustrated by Cathy Wilcox (1993,  pbk and  hbk)
 Throw away lines: cartoons / Cathy Wilcox with an introduction by Patrick Cook (1991)

External links

  Cathy Wilcox – 27 June 2004 article from The Age
 www.cathywilcox.com.au– Cathy Wilcox's website
Cathy Wilcox TEDx

Australian women cartoonists
Australian editorial cartoonists
Living people
1963 births
People educated at Abbotsleigh